Prakash Jaganath Fadte is an Indian politician. He was elected to the Goa Legislative Assembly from Maem in the 1999 Goa Legislative Assembly election as a member of the Bharatiya Janata Party. He was Minister of Education, Science and Technology and Printing and Stationery in Francisco Sardinha cabinet from November 1999 to October 2000.

References

1954 births
2017 deaths
Goa MLAs 2012–2017
People from North Goa district
Bharatiya Janata Party politicians from Goa
United Goans Democratic Party politicians
Goa MLAs 1999–2002